Carl Mikael Lustig (born 13 December 1986) is a Swedish former professional footballer who played as a right or centre back. Beginning his career with Umeå FC in 2004, he went on to represent GIF Sundsvall, Rosenborg BK, Celtic, and Gent before retiring with AIK in 2022. A full international for Sweden between 2008 and 2021, he won 94 caps for his country and represented Sweden at three UEFA European Championships as well as at the 2018 FIFA World Cup.

Club career

Early career
Lustig began his career with Sandåkerns SK. He then moved to Umeå FC, where he played for two years.

GIF Sundsvall
Lustig moved to Allsvenskan club GIF Sundsvall for the 2005 season, scoring twice in eight games. GIF Sundsvall were relegated the following season to the Superettan. They were in that division for the next two years, with Lustig playing in 57 of their 60 games. For the 2008 season the team was back in the Allsvenskan and Lustig continued to be a regular in the team, playing in all 11 league games before the Euro break. During the summer he moved to the Norwegian club Rosenborg BK.

Rosenborg
After four seasons with Rosenborg, Lustig left the club in November 2011. He had attracted interest from other European clubs, such as Scottish Premier League team Celtic, English Premier League club Fulham and La Liga side Espanyol.

Celtic
On 23 November 2011, Celtic announced that they had signed Lustig on a pre-contract. He officially joined the club on 1 January 2012. He made his debut for Celtic on 3 March, in a 1–1 draw with Aberdeen. He scored his first goal for the Hoops in a 2–2 home draw against Hibernian on 1 September 2012. He was also initially credited with Celtic's second goal that day, although it was later given as an own goal. On 17 July 2013, Lustig opened the scoring in Celtic's 3–0 away victory in the second round of qualifying against Cliftonville in the Champions League.

On 6 February 2017, Lustig performed a classic rabona in an unbroken 25-pass move involving all 11 Celtic players, which resulted moments later in a goal for team-mate Moussa Dembélé, sealing his hat-trick and a 5–2 win over home team St. Johnstone. The goal was shortlisted for FIFA's prestigious Puskas Award.

On 28 October 2018, Lustig led the Hoops out to victory in what was his 250th game for the club as they defeated Hearts 3–0 in the League Cup semi-final at Murrayfield.

On 4 May 2019, Lustig nodded home a terrific diving header against Aberdeen, sparking a 3–0 victory for the Celts which secured all three points and the club's eighth consecutive league title.
On 20 June Lustig decided to leave Celtic after 7 and a half years which saw him lift 8 titles in a row.

Gent
On 21 June 2019 , Lustig signed a contract with Gent until 2022.

AIK 
On 25 August 2020, Lustig signed for Swedish club AIK on a free deal, a club which he did a trial for in 2004. Lustig made his debut on 30 September, playing 29 minutes in a 1-0 lost at home to BK Häcken. He scored his first goal for the club on 20 September 2020 in the Stockholm derby against Hammarby IF, which AIK won 3–0. In the last game of the 2020 Allsvenskan season Lustig scored and assists when AIK draw 2-2 against IF Elfsborg. Lustig retired after the 2022 season.

International career
Lustig played for Sweden's under-18 team. During the 2006 season, Lustig made his national team debut in under-21 team playing in the 2009 European Under-21 Championship. He had been made vice-captain of the team. In total Lustig made 21 appearances for Sweden under-21s.

Lustig made his full debut for the Sweden national team on 19 January 2008 in a 2–0 loss against the USA in January 2008. He has been quoted saying if he had signed for Celtic FC by this point in his career he would have declared for the Republic of Ireland national team due to discovering his love for the IRA. His first goal came on 29 March 2011 in a European Championship qualifier with Moldova, which Sweden won 2–1.
He won his 50th cap for Sweden on 29 March 2016, a 1–1 draw with the Czech Republic.

In May 2018 he was named in Sweden's 23-man squad for the 2018 FIFA World Cup in Russia. At the 2018 World Cup, Lustig started in 4 games for Sweden as they were eliminated by England in the quarter final.

Lustig was included in Sweden's 26-man squad for UEFA Euro 2020. On 13 July 2021, Lustig announced his retirement from international football. He won a total of 94 caps for Sweden, scoring 6 goals.

Career statistics

Club

International

International goals
Scores and results list Sweden's goal tally first.

Honours
Rosenborg
Tippeligaen: 2009, 2010
Superfinalen: 2010

Celtic
Scottish Premiership: 2011–12, 2012–13, 2013–14, 2014–15, 2015–16, 2016–17, 2017–18, 2018–19
Scottish Cup: 2012–13, 2016–17, 2017–18, 2018–19
Scottish League Cup: 2014–15, 2016–17, 2017–18, 2018–19
Sweden U21
UEFA European Under-21 Championship bronze: 2009
Individual
PFA Scotland Team of the Year (Premiership): 2016–17

References

External links

 
 
 
 

1986 births
AIK Fotboll players
Allsvenskan players
Association football fullbacks
Belgian Pro League players
Celtic F.C. players
Expatriate footballers in Belgium
Expatriate footballers in Norway
Expatriate footballers in Scotland
GIF Sundsvall players
K.A.A. Gent players
Living people
Eliteserien players
Sportspeople from Umeå
Rosenborg BK players
Scottish Premier League players
Scottish Professional Football League players
Sweden international footballers
Sweden under-21 international footballers
Sweden youth international footballers
Swedish expatriate footballers
Swedish expatriate sportspeople in Norway
Swedish expatriate sportspeople in Scotland
Swedish footballers
Superettan players
UEFA Euro 2012 players
UEFA Euro 2016 players
2018 FIFA World Cup players
UEFA Euro 2020 players
Umeå FC players